The 2018 Ball State Cardinals football team represented Ball State University in the 2018 NCAA Division I FBS football season. They were led by third-year head coach Mike Neu and played their home games at Scheumann Stadium in Muncie, Indiana as members of the West Division of the Mid-American Conference. They finished the season 4–8, 3–5 in MAC play to finish in fifth place in the West Division.

Previous season 
The Cardinals finished the 2017 season 2–10, 0–8 in MAC play to finish in last place in the West Division.

Preseason

Award watch lists
Listed in the order that they were released

Preseason media poll
The MAC released their preseason media poll on July 24, 2018, with the Cardinals predicted to finish in last place in the West Division.

Schedule

Source:

Roster

Game summaries

Central Connecticut

at Notre Dame

at Indiana

Western Kentucky

Kent State

Northern Illinois

at Central Michigan

Eastern Michigan

at Ohio

at Toledo

Western Michigan

at Miami (OH)

References

Ball State
Ball State Cardinals football seasons
Ball State Cardinals football